NEO Sports was an Indian television channel, owned and operated by Nimbus Communications. Launched on 8 November 2006, it covers virtually all prime events in almost all popular sports like Golf, Football, Basketball, Tennis, Table Tennis, Motor Racing, Horse Racing and Sailing. The channel has Golf as a prime sport along with football.

Event

Cricket 

 International cricket in New Zealand till 2013
 International cricket in Bangladesh till 2013
 International cricket in India till March 2012
 Domestic cricket in India till March 2012
 Asia Cup till 2012

Football 
 A-League
 Eredivisie
 Coppa Italia
 Copa French
FIFA Club World Cup

Sister channel
 NEO Prime 
 It's sister channel Neo Cricket (later rebranded to Neo Prime) used to telecast BCCI's International and domestic cricket matches in until 2012.

References

External links

 Ibnlive.in.com
 Bestmediainfo.com
 Sportbusiness.com

Television channels and stations established in 2006